Another Cinderella Story is a 2008 American teen musical comedy film directed by Damon Santostefano and written by Erik Patterson and Jessica Scott. The film stars Selena Gomez, Drew Seeley and Jane Lynch. It is a sequel to A Cinderella Story (2004) and the second installment in the A Cinderella Story series. Like the first film, it is a retelling of the Cinderella fairy tale in a modern setting. The film was released on DVD on September 16, 2008 and premiered on ABC Family on January 18, 2009.

The film was followed by A Cinderella Story: Once Upon a Song (2011).

Plot
Mary Santiago, a high school senior aspiring to become a dancer, was adopted by washed-up pop star Dominique Blatt, because her deceased mother was one of Dominique's dancers. At home, Dominique and her snobby daughters Britt and Bree treat Mary as a slave. While in school, Mary and her best friend Tami are bullied by Britt, Bree, and Joey Parker's ex-girlfriend, Natalia Faroush. Joey Parker, a famous celebrity and pop star, has returned to school for his senior year and to remember why he started dancing, accompanied by his best friend, Dustin/The Funk. He is also hosting a dance contest where the winner will be his partner in his next music video. It is revealed that Natalia is determined to get back together with him.

Joey hosts a dance class that Natalia, Britt, and Bree attend. Mary sneaks behind the one-way mirror and is the only one able to match his moves, but her cell phone rings and she flees. Later, Dominique, hoping to revitalize her career, asks Joey to perform a duet with her while Britt and Bree hit on him, but he refuses and brings up a time Dominique insulted him on TRL.

The school holds a masquerade ball on Valentine's Day, but Dominique plans to go partying and orders Mary to clean her room by midnight. Fortunately, Tami contacts her sister's boyfriend's family, who owns a cleaning service; and offers to help. Tami provides them with outfits for the ball. Joey and Mary stun everyone with their skills, but Britt and Bree spill a bowl of M&M's and Mary falls. Joey helps Mary up and takes his mask off, shocking her. Mary notices a clock and realizes she has fifteen minutes before Dominique arrives. She accidentally drops her Zune, but returns home just in time.

The next day, Joey announces to the school that he has the Zune, saying whoever can announce the top four most played songs is the mystery girl. A bunch of girls (and a few boys) get in line and try to do it, obviously failing. Britt and Bree conclude Mary is the mystery girl and threatens to release an embarrassing video she made when she was eleven, if she tries to tell Joey. Tami convinces her not to care about that, and she tries to tell him, but he blows her off.

At Britt and Bree's birthday party, Dustin recognizes Tami as his dance partner and flirts with her having proved his identity. Mary tries to tell Joey again, but Britt and Bree play the video. Embarrassed, Mary runs to her room. She plays the song from the ball. Joey realizes she was the mystery girl and asks her on a date. Later, Mary receives a letter saying she has been accepted by the Manhattan Academy of Performing Arts, but when the academy calls to confirm it, Dominique answers and claims Mary has "two broken legs".

Attempting to stop the date, Britt and Bree give Mary a ridiculous number of chores, but this backfires when Joey helps her by dancing through them. She helps him write his next song. He "invites" her to his house, but when she arrives, she sees through the window, Natalia talking to Joey in bed and runs off in tears. Dominique insincerely comforts her and claims the academy rejected her.

Joey is confused when she gives him the cold shoulder. Dustin confronts Tami, who berates Joey for cheating on Mary. They clarify Natalia broke into his house to drive Mary away. Tami agrees to help them. The dance contest is near, and Tami and Dustin convince a still bitter Mary to attend. A Manhattan Academy representative is there at Joey's invitation. After Britt, Bree, and Natalia put on lackluster performances, Joey calls Mary to the stage and convinces her to dance with him. The duo performs the song they wrote. Joey admits that there's nothing going on between him and Natalia. Mary wins the contest and Natalia admits Mary did great. The representative reveals Dominique's lie and says Mary is accepted. Joey and Mary kiss. Dominique tries to leave the stage and falls, ironically breaking both of her legs.

As Mary, Joey, Tami, and Dustin load Mary's belongings in a van, a wheelchair-using Dominique begs her not to go as Joey and Mary share another kiss and drive away.

Cast

Reception
Amber Wilkinson of Eye for Film gave the film three out of five stars and said the age difference between Gomez and Seeley was inappropriate, saying that "it's a shame there isn't more thought put into their age."  She also said that the "characters are so wafer thin they barely cast a shadow."  Although Wilkinson says that the film is completely different from A Cinderella Story, Lacey Walker, reviewing for Christian Answers, notes several aspects of the two films that were directly parallel to each other.  Walker also gave it three out of five stars, praising the script, saying the writers "peppered this story with a surprising dose of humor and some pleasing plot twists."  However, Walker specifically criticized the "glaringly obvious" age difference between the 15-year-old Gomez and the 26-year-old Seeley.

Soundtrack

References

External links

 
 
 
 

A Cinderella Story (film series)
2008 films
2008 direct-to-video films
2008 romantic comedy films
2000s dance films
2000s high school films
2000s hip hop films
2000s musical comedy films
2000s romantic musical films
2000s teen comedy films
2000s teen romance films
American dance films
American direct-to-video films
American high school films
American musical comedy films
American romantic comedy films
American romantic musical films
American sequel films
American teen comedy films
American teen musical films
American teen romance films
Direct-to-video comedy films
Direct-to-video sequel films
2000s English-language films
Films based on Cinderella
Films directed by Damon Santostefano
Films scored by John Paesano
Films set in 2008
Films set in Los Angeles
Films shot in Vancouver
Valentine's Day in films
Warner Bros. direct-to-video films
2000s American films